was a Japanese daimyō of the early Edo period. He was the 4th daimyō from the Tōdō clan to rule Tsu Domain in Ise and Iga Provinces.

Biography
Takachika was the younger brother of Tōdō Takahisa, the 3rd daimyō of Tsu Domain. In 1703, he became daimyo upon the death of his elder brother. During his short reign, the domain suffered greatly from damaged caused by the 1703 Genroku earthquake, during which the clan's Edo residence was destroyed. The subsequent 1707 Hōei earthquake also caused massive damage in the clan's territories in Ise Province. 

Takachika had two sons and one daughter, all of his children predeceased him. On his death in 1708, Tōdō Takatoshi, from the branch line of the clan at Hisai Domain was adopted as his heir and successor.

External links
 Tōdō family information

Notes

Daimyo
1667 births
1708 deaths